Crystal Creek is a rural locality in the City of Townsville, Queensland, Australia.

Geography

The Paluma Range National Park is in the north of the suburb and the Rollingstone State Forest is in the south of the suburb. Crystal Creek (the creek from which the suburb takes its name) is a major tourist attraction in the area.

Heritage listings
Crystal Creek has a number of heritage-listed sites, including:
 Mount Spec Road: Little Crystal Creek Bridge

References

City of Townsville
Localities in Queensland
Suburbs of Townsville